Parkersburg is a city in and the county seat of Wood County, West Virginia. Located at the confluence of the Ohio and Little Kanawha rivers, it is the state's fourth-largest city and the largest city in the Parkersburg–Vienna metropolitan area. The city's population was 29,749 at the 2020 census, and its metro population was 89,490.

The Baltimore and Ohio Railroad reached Parkersburg in 1857, but lacked a crossing over the Ohio River until after the American Civil War. When the B&O completed the Parkersburg Bridge (CSX) 1868–1870 to Belpre, it was the longest railroad bridge in the world.

The Bureau of the Public Debt, an agency of the U.S. Treasury Department, was relocated from the Washington, D.C. metropolitan area in the late 20th century and headquartered in Parkersburg. In October 2012, it was merged with the Financial Management Service to form the Bureau of the Fiscal Service.

History

Settlers at first named the city Newport when they settled it in the late 18th century following the American Revolutionary War. This was part of a westward migration of settlers from parts of Virginia to the east, closer to the Atlantic Ocean. A town section was laid out on land granted to Alexander Parker for his Revolutionary War service. Virginia made grants of land to veterans for their war service. The title conflicts between Parker and the city planners of Newport were settled in 1809 in favor of his heirs. The town was renamed Parkersburg in 1810. It was chartered by the Virginia General Assembly in 1820. It was rechartered as a city in 1860.

The town was the western terminus of both the Staunton-Parkersburg Turnpike and the Northwestern Turnpike. In 1857 the Baltimore and Ohio Railroad built a branch line south to the town from Wheeling, West Virginia. Travelers wanting to connect with the Ohio Marietta and Cincinnati Railroad, one of the east–west lines along the Ohio River, had to take a steamboat 14 miles north to Marietta, Ohio.

Jacob Linville designed the railroad bridge planned by the B&O. It was constructed in 1868–1870 between Parkersburg and Belpre, Ohio, as part of the B&O's main line from Baltimore to St. Louis, Missouri. This drew traffic and trade from Marietta. Today the structure is known as the Parkersburg Bridge.

Parkersburg served as a transportation and medical center for Union forces during the American Civil War. It developed further as a transportation hub in the gas and oil boom following that war.

Blennerhassett Island Historical State Park is a historical island located just below Parkersburg.

In the late 19th century Parkersburg emerged as a major oil refining center serving nearby oilfields at Volcano and Burning Springs. The Camden Consolidated Oil Company, founded in 1866 by future U.S. Senator Johnson Newlon Camden, dominated the refining business and was sold to Rockefeller's Standard Oil Company in 1875. Camden became a Standard director and vice president and, along with John W. Davis, dominated West Virginia politics until the early 20th century.

In the post-World War II period, Parkersburg became one of the leading industrial centers of the Ohio Valley, producing chemicals, glass, O. Ames tools, textiles (especially American Viscose Company rayon), plastics and polymers, iron, and steel.

Geography
Parkersburg is located at 39°15'58" North, 81°32'32" West (39.266175, −81.542139).

The city is situated at the confluence of the Little Kanawha and Ohio rivers. The Little Kanawha River divides the north and south sides of the city. Worthington Creek, a tributary of the Little Kanawha River, flows through the eastern part of the city.

Climate
The climate in this area is characterized by hot, humid summers, cold winters and evenly distributed precipitation throughout the year.  According to the Köppen Climate Classification system, Parkersburg has a humid continental climate, abbreviated Dfa on climate maps.

Demographics

2010 census
As of the census of 2010, there were 31,492 people, 13,807 households, and 8,086 families residing in the city. The racial makeup of the city was 94.9% White, 2.0% African American, 0.3% Native American, 0.4% Asian, 0.1% Pacific Islander, 0.3% from other races, and 2.1% from two or more races. Hispanic or Latino of any race were 1.2% of the population.

There were 13,807 households, of which 27.0% had children under the age of 18 living with them, 39.1% were married couples living together, 14.3% had a female householder with no husband present, 5.1% had a male householder with no wife present, and 41.4% were non-families. 35.0% of all households were made up of individuals, and 14.3% had someone living alone who was 65 years of age or older. The average household size was 2.24 and the average family size was 2.86.

The median age in the city was 41.2 years. 21.3% of residents were under the age of 18; 8.2% were between the ages of 18 and 24; 25% were from 25 to 44; 27.5% were from 45 to 64; and 18% were 65 years of age or older. The gender makeup of the city was 47.5% male and 52.5% female.

2000 census
As of the census of 2000, there were 33,099 people, 14,467 households, and 8,767 families residing in the city. In 2012 the U.S. Census Bureau estimated that Parkersburg's population had decreased 0.5% to 31,261. The population density was 2,800.5 people per square mile (1,081.2/km2). There were 16,100 housing units at an average density of 1,362.2 per square mile (525.9/km2). The racial makeup of the city was 96.4% White, 1.8% African American, 0.4% Native American, 0.2% Asian, 0.1% Pacific Islander, 0.2% from other races, and 1.0% from two or more races. Hispanic or Latino of any race were 0.8% of the population.

There were 14,467 households, out of which 25.0% had children under the age of 18 living with them, 43.2% were married couples living together, 13.5% had a female householder with no husband present, and 39.4% were non-families. 34.0% of all households were made up of individuals, and 15.1% had someone living alone who was 65 years of age or older. The average household size was 2.23 and the average family size was 2.83.

In the city the population was spread out, with 21.2% under the age of 18, 9.1% from 18 to 24, 27.1% from 25 to 44, 23.7% from 45 to 64, and 18.9% who were 65 years of age or older. The median age was 40 years. For every 100 females, there were 87.6 males. For every 100 females age 18 and over, there were 83.9 males.

The median income for a household in the city was $21,120, and the median income for a family was $29,731. Males had a median income of $28,320 versus $18,203 for females. The per capita income for the city was $15,820. About 23.3% of families and 21.2% of the population were below the poverty line, including 35.2% of those under the age of 18 and 12.5% of those 65 and older.

Arts and culture

Annual cultural events

The Annual Mid-Ohio Valley Multi-Cultural Festival is held in June, and is an international festival featuring traditional dance and music and an international marketplace. The Parkersburg Homecoming Festival is held in August and features a parade, fireworks, half-marathon, competitions and entertainment.

The Taste of Parkersburg is an event held around Memorial Day each year since 2006 which features food and drinks from local vendors.

The Downtown Throwdown is BBQ and beer festival held in September. It is co-hosted by Downtown PKB and the Parkersburg Area Jaycees and was started in 2014.

Tourism

Several museums are located in Parkersburg, including the Blennerhassett Museum of Regional History, the Henry Cooper House, the Oil and Gas Museum, the Sumnerite African-American History Museum, the Artcraft Studio and the Veterans Museum of Mid-Ohio Valley.

Sports
The Wood County Ravens, a semi-professional football team, was based in the city. The Ravens were a part of the now defunct Mountain State Football League.

Parkersburg was home to the Ohio Valley Redcoats, a minor league baseball team, until 1998. The city was in negotiations to bring professional baseball back to Parkersburg but those negotiations fell through because of lack of support from the community.

In 2008, the city and its three high schools placed second in ESPN's TitleTown USA competition.

"We don't have a lot of people, nor any professional sports teams, but here is a stat for you. AAA is the highest level that a high school can compete at in W.Va. Two of the three schools mentioned hereafter are AAA schools. In Parkersburg, we have accumulated 192 overall state championships in 103 years with 183 of those coming since 1950. Parkersburg High School alone has 137 championships in its 103 years of existence. Parkersburg South High School has 38 titles in 40 years. Not to be outdone Parkersburg Catholic, a single A school, has 17 state titles of its own. Not bad considering that there are 136 high school teams in West Virginia with 38 in AAA. We may not have a pro sports team, but in high school sports, Parkersburg as a whole is pretty dominant" as written in an article on espn.com.

Parks and recreation
There are several parks in the area, including Blennerhassett Island Historical State Park, Bicentennial Park, Corning Park, Point Park, Southwood Park, Quincy Park, City Park, Johnson T. Janes Park, Friendship Park, Fort Boreman Historical Park, Mountwood Park and Fries Park.

Education

Higher education
 Mountain State College, a private, for-profit, two-year college, is located in the city.
 West Virginia University at Parkersburg, a public college, is located on the outskirts of the city.
 Parkersburg Bible College, a private Christian school
 Centurion Bible College
 Ohio Valley University is located nearby in Vienna. Closed in 2022.

High schools
Parkersburg is the home of the Parkersburg High School Big Reds, Parkersburg South High School Patriots, and the Parkersburg Catholic High School Crusaders. The Wood County Technical Center is part of Wood County Public Schools.

Middle schools
There were, as of May 2020, five middle schools dispersed throughout the city.

Elementary schools
There were, as of May 2020, 18 elementary schools dispersed throughout the city.

Media
The Parkersburg News and Parkersburg Sentinel were the city's two major daily newspapers until 2009 when they combined to form one daily edition, The Parkersburg News and Sentinel. The same company also publishes The Marietta Times and Graffiti, West Virginia's alternative news magazine.

There are many radio stations broadcasting from Parkersburg, including 106.1 Z106 (WRZZ),102.1 The River (WRVB), U.S. 107 WNUS, MIX 100 (WDMX), V96.9 (WVVV), WXIL, Froggy 99.1, 103.1 The Bear, and WPKM 96.3 FM "the Beat" which is the college radio station of West Virginia University at Parkersburg.

WTAP, the local NBC affiliate, is the main local television station. WIYE-LD (CBS) and WOVA-LD (Fox / CW+) are sister stations.

Infrastructure

Transportation
Parkersburg is served by two major highways, Interstate 77 and US 50. Other routes through the city include WV routes 2, 14, 47, 68, 95 and 618.

Parkersburg is served by Mid-Ohio Valley Regional Airport, with three flights a day Monday through Friday from Charlotte Douglas International Airport.

Parkersburg is served by freight rail. Passenger rail is no longer available. Into the 1960s, several major long distance train routes  made stops in Parkersburg. These included the Baltimore and Ohio's National Limited to St. Louis to the west and Washington, D.C., Baltimore and Jersey City to the east. From 1976 to 1981 Amtrak operated the Shenandoah (Amtrak train), serving Cincinnati to the west and Washington, D.C., to the east.

Pollution
High levels of PFOA, also known as C8, originating in landfills used by the DuPont/Chemours chemical company have been noted in Parkersburg drinking water. Despite a 2004 class-action legal settlement obligating DuPont to install a drinking water filtration plant if asked, local water district officials have not, as of 2016, asked for one.

Notable people

 Allen Appel, novelist
 Walt Barnes, professional football player and actor
 Dick Biddle, college football coach
 Zac Boggs, soccer player 
 Harman Blennerhassett, ally of Aaron Burr and owner of Blennerhassett Island
 Sybil Carmen, Ziegfeld Girl and silent film actress
 Ed Catmull, president of Walt Disney Animation Studios and Pixar Animation Studios 
 Jim Dawson, cultural historian
 Paul Dooley, Hollywood character actor
 Leah Bodine Drake, poet
 Edmund Burke Fairfield, 12th Lieutenant Governor of Michigan and Chancellor of University of Nebraska
 Paul Goldsmith, member of Motorcycle Hall of Fame
 Linda Goodman, astrology author
 Tommy Hanlon, Jr., Australian television presenter
 Dick Hoblitzel, outfielder in Major League Baseball
 Homer A. Holt, justice of West Virginia Supreme Court of Appeals
 Cy Hungerford, political cartoonist for Pittsburgh Post-Gazette
 Jacob B. Jackson, Governor of West Virginia 1881–85
 John Jay Jackson, Jr., U.S. federal judge 
 Lily Irene Jackson (1848–1928), artist and daughter of John Jay Jackson, Jr.
 Robert Lichello, author
 Leon Claire Metz, historian, author, documentary personality, lecturer on American West
 Hunter Holmes Moss, Jr., Republican U.S. Representative
 Earle "Greasy" Neale (1891–1973), professional football and baseball player
 Gary Null, nutritionist and author
 Devon Odessa, actress and film producer
 Buck Rinehart, Republican, Mayor of Columbus, Ohio
 Bill Robinson, jazz singer 
 Morgan Spurlock, documentary filmmaker, humorist, television producer, screenwriter, and political activist 
 Mick Staton, Republican, U.S. Representative
 William E. Stevenson, Governor of West Virginia, 1869–71
 Felix Stump, admiral in U.S. Navy and Commander, United States Pacific Fleet 
 Nick Swisher, professional baseball player and Steve's son
 Steve Swisher, professional baseball player and Nick's father
 Peter G. Van Winkle, Republican U.S. Senator
 Richard Watts, Jr., film critic for New York Herald Tribune
 Gibby Welch, professional football player 
 Albert B. White, Governor of West Virginia, 1901–05
 Deron Williams, professional basketball player 
 Jay Wolfe, West Virginia State Senator and U.S. Senate candidate
 Chase Fieler, professional basketball player
 John D. Hoblitzell Jr., U.S. Senator, born and raised in Parkersburg

Neighborhoods

North Parkersburg  (North End)

Beechwood, Downtown, Fairview Heights, Granada Hills, Julia-Ann Square, Meadowcrest, Oakwood Estates, Quincy Hill, Riverside, Woodland Park,  North End, Worthington, East End

South Parkersburg (South Side)
The southern part of the City of Parkersburg, South Parkersburg was a separate city until it became part of Parkersburg in 1950. Suburban parts of southern Wood County include Blennerhassett, Lubeck, and Washington to the southwest, with Mineral Wells located to the southeast.

Film and television
 The Mark Ruffalo film Dark Waters, released in 2019, was based in events mainly from the City of Parkersburg.
 The Steven Soderbergh film Bubble, released in 2006, was filmed in Parkersburg and neighboring Belpre, Ohio, using an all-local cast.
 Parkersburg was mentioned in the novel Night of the Hunter (1953) and the 1955 film by the same name adapted from it. In Davis Grubb's 1953 novel, Parkersburg was the town where the preacher Harry Powell was caught for car theft and sent to prison. It was worldly town that Rachel Cooper (Lillian Gish in the film) avoided because she'd been short-changed; and finally it was the home of the state troopers who came to arrest Powell for murder. Powell called Parkersburg, "One of them Sodoms on the Ohio River," referring to its reputation as a rough river town in the 19th and early 20th century.
 Parkersburg was the set for the 1962 television series It's a Man's World.
 The city was featured in a 1996 episode of Rescue 911.
 Other films shot in the city are Salvage and The Barbecue.
Parkersburg was featured in a 2013 episode of the NBC post-apocalyptic science fiction television drama series Revolution.

Awards
 CNNMoney.com named the city the #7 Best Shrinking Place to Live.
 Best place to retire in West Virginia – USA Today, 2018 
Runner-up, Golden Crater Award – Streetsblog, 2015.

Sister cities

See also 

 Hughes River Wildlife Management Area
 List of cities and towns along the Ohio River
 List of Registered Historic Places in West Virginia
 Vienna, WV
 Grand Central Mall

References

Further reading
 
 Philip W. Sturm. A River to Cross: The Bicentennial History of Wood County, West Virginia. Published 1999 by The Bicentennial Commission of Wood County, WV. Josten Publishing Co., State College, PA
 Philip W. Sturm. Wood County Reflections: A Pictorial History. Published 2005, Donning Company Publishers, Virginia Beach, VA.
 Bernard L. Allen. Parkersburg: A Bicentennial History. Parkersburg Bicentennial Committee. Printed 1985 by Josten Publishing Co., State College, PA.

External links
 

 Parkersburg News and Sentinel newspaper
 Parkersburg's website
 Greater Parkersburg Tourism
 

 
Cities in West Virginia
Cities in Wood County, West Virginia
Little Kanawha River
Northwestern Turnpike
County seats in West Virginia
West Virginia populated places on the Ohio River
1810 establishments in Virginia
Populated places established in 1810